The mayor of Ilagan is the head of the local government of the city of Ilagan, Isabela who is elected to three year terms. The Mayor is also the executive head and leads the city's departments in executing the city ordinances and improving public services. The city mayor is restricted to three consecutive terms, totaling nine years, although a mayor can be elected again after an interruption of one term.

There were 28 municipal mayors during its period as a municipality since 1904. The first elected city mayor was Josemarie L. Diaz in 2013.

Municipal Mayors (1904-2011)

The years 1999 and 2012 were a transition period to Ilagan Cityhood but the former was failed and latter was a huge success.

City Mayors (2012-Present)

References

Lists of mayors of places in the Philippines
Ilagan